Ye Peijian (born January 1945) is a Chinese aerospace engineer. He is the Chief Commander and Chief Designer of the Chinese Lunar Exploration Program.

Early life and education

Ye was born in Huzhuang Village, Taixing, Jiangsu, China, in January 1945. In 1962, he graduated from Huzhou Middle School in Huzhou, Zhejiang province. 

Ye completed his undergraduate education in radio science and graduated from Zhejiang University in 1967. Taking the advice of Chinese aerospace engineer Yang Jiachi to avoid the United States because of American restrictions on sensitive technology, he studied at University of Neuchâtel in Switzerland and received a Doctor of Science in 1985.

Career 
Ye is a professor both at the Beijing University of Aeronautics and Astronautics and the Harbin Institute of Technology. He is a research fellow and Chief Engineer at the Chinese Academy of Space Technology.

Ye joined the Communist Party of China in 1986. He became an academician of the Chinese Academy of Sciences in 2003.

Ye speaks English and French fluently. The inner main-belt asteroid 456677 Yepeijian, discovered by the PMO NEO Survey Program at XuYi Station in 2007, was named in his honor. Naming citation was published on 12 January 2017.

References 
 

1945 births
Living people
Academic staff of Beihang University
Chinese aerospace engineers
Chinese expatriates in Switzerland
Engineers from Jiangsu
Academic staff of Harbin Institute of Technology
Members of the Chinese Academy of Sciences
Scientists from Taizhou, Jiangsu
University of Neuchâtel alumni
Zhejiang University alumni